Prather is an unincorporated community in Fresno County, California. Prather has a population of 1,569.

The post office in Prather first opened in 1914, closed in 1935, re-opened in 1936, and moved in 1939. The name honors Joseph L. Prather who came to California in 1872 and whose ranch became the site of the town. It is the last community on California State Route 168 before the route climbs into the Sierras, passing Shaver Lake and Huntington Lake.

References

Unincorporated communities in California
Unincorporated communities in Fresno County, California